Bank of Africa Tanzania Limited, also known as BOA Tanzania (BOAT), is one of the commercial banks in Tanzania that have been licensed by the Bank of Tanzania, the country's central bank and national banking regulator.

Location
The headquarters and main branch of Bank of Africa Tanzania Limited, are located at National Development Corporation House, Ohio Street, at the corner with Kivukoni Road, in the central business district of Dar es Salaam, Tanzania's business capital and largest city. The geographical coordinates of the bank's headquarters are: 6°49'03.0"S, 39°17'31.0"E (Latitude:-6.817500; Longitude:39.291944).

Overview
BOA Tanzania is a retail commercial bank that provides services to multinational companies, mid-size local enterprises, and small retail businesses. As of December 2019, BOA Tanzania was a medium-sized financial services provider, with total assets of TSh 564 billion (approximately US$245.4 million), with customer deposits totalling TSh 390 billion (approximately US$169.7 million).

Bank of Africa Group
The bank is a member of the Bank of Africa Group, a multinational, Pan African bank headquartered in Bamako, Mali, with presence in 18 countries, across a network of 16 commercial banks, one financial corporation, one banque de l’habitat, one brokerage firm, two investment companies, one asset management company and one Group representative office in Paris. As of December 2018, the group's total assets were valued at €7.62 billion (US$8.24 billion).

History
BOA Tanzania started its operations in June 2007, when Bank of Africa Group acquired Euroafrican Bank Tanzania, which had been operational since 1995.

Governance
The bank is supervised by a board of directors, chaired by Ambassador Mwanaidi Maajar, a non-executive board member. The managing director and chief executive officer of the bank is Joseph Iha Wanje.

Branch network
As of December 2019, the bank maintained 27 networked branches, including 13 branches in Dar es Salaam, 13 branches in other Tanzanian cities and towns and one Business Centre in Dar es Salaam.

See also

List of banks in Tanzania

References

External links
 

 

Banks of Tanzania
Bank of Africa Group
Banks established in 2007
2007 establishments in Tanzania